The 2014 African Cross Country Championships was the third edition of the international cross country running competition for African athletes organised by the Confederation of African Athletics. It was held on 16 March at the Kololo Golf Course in Kampala, Uganda – the first time an East African nation had hosted the event since its re-launch in 2011.

For a third successive time, Kenya dominated the event, led by men's winner Leonard Barsoton and women's winner Faith Chepngetich Kipyegon. The country won all of the senior race medals and had perfect scores in the team race, having the fourth-place finishers as well. In the junior races Moses Letoyie and Agnes Jebet Tirop similarly led the Kenyans to victory. Afewerki Berhane of Eritrea (third in the men's junior race) and Alemitu Heroye of Ethiopia (second in the women's junior race) were the only non-Kenyan individual medallists. The hosts Uganda sent full strength senior teams and came away with the men's team silver medal and the women's team bronze medal.

The event was held in close proximity to the 2014 World University Cross Country Championships, which was set in Entebbe, Uganda, one week later.

Medallists

Individual

Team

Participation

See also
2014 Asian Cross Country Championships
2014 European Cross Country Championships

References

Individual results
Kampala2014-Results-junior-men-race. Athletics-Africa. Retrieved on 2014-03-18.
Kampala2014-Results-junior-women-race. Athletics-Africa. Retrieved on 2014-03-18.
Kampala2014-Results-senior-women-race. Athletics-Africa. Retrieved on 2014-03-18.
Kampala2014-Results-senior-men-race. Athletics-Africa. Retrieved on 2014-03-18.
Team results
Kampala2014-Results-junior-women-team. Athletics-Africa. Retrieved on 2014-03-18.
Kampala2014-Results-junior-men-team. Athletics-Africa. Retrieved on 2014-03-18.
Kampala2014-Results-senior-women-team. Athletics-Africa. Retrieved on 2014-03-18.
Kampala2014-Results-senior-men-team. Athletics-Africa. Retrieved on 2014-03-18.



African Cross Country
African Cross Country Championships
Cross Country
African Cross Country
Cross Country Championships
Sport in Kampala
21st century in Kampala
Athletics competitions in Uganda
International sports competitions hosted by Uganda
Cross country running in Uganda